Fairhaven Township is a civil township of Huron County in the U.S. state of Michigan.  The population was 1,259 at the 2000 census.

Communities
Bay Port is an unincorporated community in the township on M-25 on the shore of Wild Fowl Bay, which opens into the Saginaw Bay of Lake Huron. The ZIP code is 48720.
Rose Island is an unincorporated community in the Township on Saginaw Bay at Rose Island and Haist roads.
Valley Island is an unincorporated community in the Township on Saginaw Bay at Schuch and Valley Island roads. 
Weale is an unincorporated community in the Township on Saginaw Bay at Weale and Kuhl roads, after the railroad.

Geography

Fairhaven Township also contains several uninhabited islands in Saginaw Bay, which are mostly contained within Wildfowl Bay State Wildlife Area.  These islands include Defoe Island, Duck Island, Heisterman Island, Lone Tree Island, North Island, Maisou Island, Middle Grounds Island, and Pitchers Reef.

Demographics
As of the census of 2000, there were 1,259 people, 537 households, and 353 families residing in the township. The racial makeup of the township was 98.17% White, 0.32% Native American, 0.24% Asian, 0.79% from other races, and 0.48% from two or more races. Hispanic or Latino of any race were 2.14% of the population.

There were 537 households, out of which 29.6% had children under the age of 18 living with them, 52.9% were married couples living together, 9.9% had a female householder with no husband present, and 34.1% were non-families. 30.4% of all households were made up of individuals, and 11.7% had someone living alone who was 65 years of age or older.  The average household size was 2.33 and the average family size was 2.90.

In the township the population was spread out, with 23.7% under the age of 18, 7.2% from 18 to 24, 28.1% from 25 to 44, 24.9% from 45 to 64, and 16.0% who were 65 years of age or older.  The median age was 40 years. For every 100 females, there were 102.1 males.  For every 100 females age 18 and over, there were 101.9 males.

The median income for a household in the township was $33,500, and the median income for a family was $37,813. Males had a median income of $31,958 versus $20,313 for females. The per capita income for the township was $16,689.  About 8.6% of families and 11.0% of the population were below the poverty line, including 9.9% of those under age 18 and 13.2% of those age 65 or over.

References

Notes

Sources

Townships in Huron County, Michigan
Townships in Michigan
Populated places on Lake Huron in the United States